Hércules Azcune (30 August 1924 – 30 September 2004) was a Uruguayan sprinter. He competed in the men's 4 × 100 metres relay at the 1948 Summer Olympics.

References

External links
 

1924 births
2004 deaths
Athletes (track and field) at the 1948 Summer Olympics
Athletes (track and field) at the 1952 Summer Olympics
Uruguayan male sprinters
Uruguayan male high jumpers
Uruguayan decathletes
Olympic athletes of Uruguay
Place of birth missing
20th-century Uruguayan people
21st-century Uruguayan people